Jeppe Vestergaard is a Danish former footballer who played as a defender. Tom Prahl said he had a good left foot.

Vestergaard was part of the Herfølge squad that won the 1999–2000 Danish Superliga.

References

Living people
Association football defenders
Danish men's footballers
Danish expatriate men's footballers
Danish Superliga players
Allsvenskan players
Herfølge Boldklub players
Malmö FF players
Expatriate footballers in Sweden
1972 births